Samuel Stückler (born 14 February 2001) is an Austrian professional footballer who plays as a centre-back for Sturm Graz.

Career
Stückler is a youth product of SV Bad St. Leonhard and joined the Sturm Graz youth academy in 2011. He made his senior debut with Sturm Graz in a 3–1 Austrian Football Bundesliga win over Wolfsberger AC on 22 May 2021, coming on as a late substitute. He signed his first professional contract with Sturm Graz on 4 December 2021.

International career
Stückler is a youth international for Austria, having represented the Austria U15s and U19s.

References

External links
 
 OEFB Profile

2001 births
Footballers from Carinthia (state)
Living people
Austrian footballers
Austria youth international footballers
SK Sturm Graz players
Austrian Football Bundesliga players
Austrian Regionalliga players
Association football midfielders